The Al Bustan Festival of Music and the Performing Arts is an annual music and performing arts festival based in Beit Mery, Lebanon. The festival occurs every year over five weeks during February and March. It is a non-profit and the first major festival in Lebanon dedicated to classical music.

Background 
The Al Bustan Festival of Music and the Performing Arts was founded in 1994 by Myrna Bustani to revive the country's cultural scene after seventeen years of civil war. Every year the festival organizes a program exploring a particular theme. In 2016 Music & Shakespeare was selected as the theme to mark 400 years since the death of William Shakespeare, the English playwright.

Most performances are held at the Emile Bustani Auditorium of the Al Bustan Hotel in Beit Mery, with the rest occurring in churches and cultural venues across Lebanon, such as the Sursock Palace and the Jeita Grotto.

The festival performances include opera, dance, and orchestral concerts, performed by a mix of international artists and local ensembles. Public master classes and workshops are organized with visiting artists to keep up with the festival's cultural vocation. Most of the festival budget is covered by donations from private sponsors and foundations.  The festival is also known for spotting rising stars and showcasing them early in their careers.

Selection of past performers

References 

Arts festivals
Classical music festivals in Asia
Classical music festivals
Annual events in Lebanon
Music festivals established in 1994
1994 establishments in Lebanon